Cyperus conicus is a sedge of the family Cyperaceae that is native to northern and north eastern parts of Australia.

It blooms between March and July producing brown flowers.

It is found in the  Kimberley, Pilbara and northern Goldfields regions of Western Australia where it grows in sandy-clay and lateritic loamy soils. The range of the plant extends across the north eastwards through the Northern Territory and Queensland and then south into New South Wales.

See also
List of Cyperus species

References

Plants described in 1874
Flora of Western Australia
Flora of the Northern Territory
Flora of Queensland
Flora of New South Wales
conicus
Taxa named by Johann Otto Boeckeler